Emma Gertrude Cummings (December 2, 1856 – October 12, 1940) was an American horticulturalist and ornithologist.

Early life and education 
Cummings was born in Cambridge, Massachusetts, and lived mainly in the town of Brookline. She was educated at Boston Art School.

Career 

Cummings was an active participant in Brookline civic life. In 1897 she contributed a chapter on botany to the town's publication Brookline: The History of a Favored Town. The following April she published an account of the people and flora of the Bahamas, "A Spring Visit to Nassau" in Popular Science Monthly.

Cummings was the first woman to hold a town office in Brookline, when she was elected a member of the town's tree planting committee. Cummings was elected an Associate of the American Ornithologists' Union in 1903. Also in 1903, she gave a lecture to the Massachusetts Horticultural Society about trees in the Southern United States. In 1904 her ornithological pocket guide Baby Pathfinder to the Birds, co-authored with Harriet E. Richards, was described in The Auk as "a convenient and helpful vade mecum", praised in the Journal of Education as a valuable guide that "no beginner or would-be beginner should be without", and cited by the Boston Herald as evidence of Cummings' exemplary status as a "twentieth century woman." She was a member of the tree planting committee from 1902 to 1939, and in 1938 published a book on the committee's history and notable trees of the town. Her book Brookline's Trees was praised by The Boston Globe, and the Boston Herald noted that it was "much used by teachers and in schools." Cummings was also a member of the Brookline Historical Society and gave talks to the membership on her travels, such as to Hawaii in 1923, and she was on the science sub-committee of the Brookline Education Society.

Personal life 
Cummings lived with her sister Mabel Cummings, and died in October 1940 in Westfield, Massachusetts.

Selected works 

 Brookline's Trees: A History of the Committee for Planting Trees of Brookline, Massachusetts and a Record of Some of Its Trees, 1938
 Baby Pathfinder to the Birds (with Harriet E. Richards), 1904
Trees in Brookline, Massachusetts: Map and Index (with Frances Prince), 1900

References

American horticulturists
American ornithologists
1856 births
1940 deaths
Women horticulturists and gardeners
Women ornithologists
19th-century American women politicians
19th-century American politicians
20th-century American women politicians
20th-century American politicians
20th-century American women scientists
19th-century American scientists
20th-century American scientists
Scientists from Massachusetts
Politicians from Boston
People from Brookline, Massachusetts
19th-century American women scientists